Sir Arthur Somervell (5 June 18632 May 1937) was an English composer and art song writer. After Hubert Parry, he was one of the most successful and influential writers of art song in the English music renaissance of the 1890s–1900s. One of his best-known works is his English-language adaptation of a Handel aria, "Silent Worship".

Career

He was born in Windermere, Westmorland, the son of shoe-manufacturer (founder of K Shoes, earlier Somervell Brothers) Robert Miller Somervell, JP of "Hazelthwaite" at Winderemere (1821-1899). The Somervell (originally Somerville) family came from Scotland, settling in London in the 1700s. Arthur Somervell's brother, shoe-manufacturer Colin Somervell was later High Sheriff of Westmorland in 1916, as was Colin's son, Maj. Arnold Colin Somervell, O.B.E. in 1936, and, later, other members of the Somervell family.

Somervell was initially educated at Uppingham School and King's College, Cambridge, where he studied composition under Sir Charles Villiers Stanford. From 1883 to 1885 he studied at the High School for Music, Berlin, and from 1885 to 1887 at the Royal College of Music in London, under Parry. He studied composition with Friedrich Kiel. He became a professor at the Royal College of Music in 1894, and conducted his own works at the Leeds and Birmingham Festivals, 1895-97. 

His style was conservative, and shows the influence of Mendelssohn and Brahms. He achieved success in his own day as a composer of choral works such as The Forsaken Merman (1895), Intimations of Immortality (which he conducted at Leeds Festival in 1907), and The Passion of Christ (1914). His Violin Concerto of 1930 was dedicated to the violinist Adila Fachiri. But today he is chiefly remembered for his song cycles such as Maud (after Tennyson, 1898) and the first known setting (1904) of A. E. Housman's A Shropshire Lad. His popular Handel adaptation "Silent Worship" was featured in the 1996 film Emma.

Somervell was also influential in the field of music education. He worked for twenty-eight years as one of His Majesty's Inspectors of Schools (HMI), with special responsibility for the teaching of music. He was appointed Inspector of Music at the Board of Education and Scottish Education Department in 1901 (succeeding John Stainer), and in June the following year received the degree Doctor of Music from the University of Cambridge.

In 1890 Somervell married Edith Lance Collet (1861-1944), and through his daughter Katherine ('Kit'), a dancer with Sergei Diaghilev's Ballets Russes, was grandfather of the writer Elizabeth Jane Howard. He was knighted in 1929.

Compositions

Operettas  
The Enchanted Prince
Princess Zara; Knave of Hearts (Novello)
Golden Straw (Curwen)
Thomas the Rhymer

Orchestral works
Thalassa Symphony in D minor (1912) (Boosey)
Helen of Kirconnel (Novello)
In Arcady (Suite for small orchestra) (Donajowski)

Concertante works
Normandy, symphonic variations for piano and orchestra (Augener, 1911)
Concertstuck for violin and orchestra (Augener, 1913) 
Highland concerto in A minor for piano and orchestra (1920)
Violin Concerto (1930).

Choral  
Mass
Power of Sound
The Charge of the Light Brigade
Elegy (Chorus and orch.) (Novello)
Song of Praise (chorus and orch.) (Metzler)
To the Vanguard; Passion of Christ (chorus and orch.) (Boosey)
Mass in D minor (Ricordi).

Chamber music 
Quintet for clarinet and strings
Suites, studies and pieces for violin and piano (Augener, Weekes, Williams and Ashdown)
Variations for 2 pianos (Augener)

Songs
Six songs by Robert Burns (1885–86)
Maud Cycle (1898)
Four songs of Innocence (1899)
Singing Time, songs for small children (1899) 
Love in Springtime Cycle (1901). (Boosey)
A Shropshire Lad Cycle (1904)
James Lee's Wife Cycle (1908)
A Broken Arc Cycle (1923)
Windflowers, Cycle for vocal quartet (Boosey).

Musicological and Musical Education works  
Rhythmic Gradus for pianoforte (Bosworth)
Exercises in sight-reading, etc. (Curwen)
School of Melody, 10 Progressive Tunes for viola and piano (1919): (Augener)
Sight-reading, 6 vols (Swan)
Sight-reading exercises (Augener)
Charts of the rules of Harmony and Counterpoint (Clarendon press)

The "Thalassa" Symphony in D minor  (The Sea Symphony), received its world premiere recording in 2011 for Cameo Classics, nearly 100 years after its composition. Written in 1912, the second movement, 'Elegy', commemorates Robert Falcon Scott's death in the Antarctic that year. The Malta Philharmonic Orchestra was conducted by its Musical Director, Michael Laus. The Piano Concerto and Normandy were recorded for Hyperion Records in 2013, with Martin Roscoe playing with the BBC Concert Orchestra under Martin Yates.

References

Sources 
A. Eaglefield-Hull (Ed.), A Dictionary of Modern Music and Musicians (Dent, London 1924).
T. Holt, Parry to Finzi: Twenty English Song-Composers (Boydell Press, Woodbridge 2002), 87-101.  
K. Shenton, 'Sir Arthur Somervell', in British Music Society Journal 9 (1987), 45-54.

External links 
 
 

1863 births
1937 deaths
English Romantic composers
English classical composers
Knights Bachelor
Composers awarded knighthoods
People from Windermere, Cumbria
Pupils of Charles Villiers Stanford
Alumni of King's College, Cambridge
English male classical composers
20th-century British male musicians
19th-century British male musicians